Jacinto Lopez Martinez Grammar School, also known as Escuela Jacinto Lopez Martinez, in Dorado, Puerto Rico, is a school built in 1923-25 which was designed by architect Pedro Adolfo de Castro.

It is a two-story U-shaped building.

Its NRHP nomination describes at as "truly, on the outside, a rich and monumental symbol of the new emphasis given to the education of the Puerto Rican youth in the 1920s and 1930s."  Its size, location on the town's main plaza, and architectural detailing "were undoubtedly meant to emphasize the differences between the new system (American) and its ideals in terms of educational goals, and the old, Spanish, ways."

References

School buildings on the National Register of Historic Places in Puerto Rico
Mission Revival architecture in Puerto Rico
School buildings completed in 1925
1925 establishments in Puerto Rico
Spanish Revival architecture in Puerto Rico
National Register of Historic Places in Dorado, Puerto Rico
Elementary schools in Puerto Rico